The men's combined was an artistic gymnastics event held as part of the Gymnastics at the 1904 Summer Olympics programme. It was the second time a combined apparatus event was held at the Olympics, though the previous incarnation was more similar to the all-around turnverein featured simultaneously with the combined. The format of the combined, however, was the basis for later all-around type events.

An unknown number of gymnasts competed, only five are known, with possibly ten gymnasts competing in total. The scores were a sum of the gymnasts' scores in the parallel bars, horizontal bar, vault, and pommel horse events. The competition was held on Friday, October 28, 1904.

Results

References

Sources
 
 

Combined